"Reuf" is a song by French hip hop artist Nekfeu featuring English musician Ed Sheeran. The eighth track from Nekfeu's debut studio album Feu, it is produced by Nekfeu himself and DJ Elite.

Although it hasn't been officially released as a single, the song entered the French Singles Chart at number 72 on 20 June 2015, where it has since peaked. A music video was announced as under development in December 2015, but had to be cancelled in March 2016 for "technical reasons."

Interviewed on 10 April 2017 on France Inter, Ed Sheeran expressed his pleasure about this collaboration, and said that he "loves Nekfeu, he's a very smart guy. He's so nice too. Although he's a rapper, he doesn't have an arrogant attitude." On 6 June 2020, an audio engineer who worked on Nekfeu's 3rd single, Les étoiles vagabondes, leaked that Nekfeu and Ed Sheeran had collaborated once more on an unreleased version of "Elle pleut".

A new version of the song, produced by Hugz Hefneer, was featured in French comedy Five, dropping Ed Sheeran's part in the chorus. This new version came out with a new video made up of excerpts from the film and behind the scenes footage.

Track listing
 Digital download
 "Reuf (featuring Ed Sheeran)" – 5:27

Charts

Weekly charts

Year-end charts

References

2015 songs
Nekfeu songs
Ed Sheeran songs
French hip hop songs
Songs written by Nekfeu
Songs written by Ed Sheeran